A Crime on the Bayou is a 2020 American documentary film, directed and produced by Nancy Buirski. It follows a young teenager challenging the most powerful white supremacist in 1960s Louisiana with the help of a young attorney. John Legend serves as an executive producer under his Get Lifted Film Company banner.

The film had its world premiere at DOC NYC on November 11, 2020. It was released on June 18, 2021, by Shout! Studios.

Synopsis
The film follows Gary Duncan, a teenager from Louisiana, who gets arrested after trying to break up a fight between white and black teenagers. He seeks help from Richard Sobol who stands up to a legal system powered by white supremacy.

Release
The film had its world premiere at DOC NYC on November 11, 2020. In April 2021, Shout! Studios acquired U.S. distribution rights to the film. It was released on June 18, 2021.

Reception
A Crime on the Bayou received positive reviews from film critics. On Metacritic, the film holds a rating of 81 out of 100, based on 6 critics, indicating "universal acclaim".

See also
 Duncan v. Louisiana

References

External links
 
 
 

2020 films
2020 documentary films
American documentary films
Documentary films about racism
Documentary films about racism in the United States
2020s English-language films
2020s American films